Jesús Gerardo Hernández Castellar (born 5 October 2001) is a Venezuelan footballer who plays as an midfielder.

Career

Club career
Hernández is a product of Monagas. He got his professional debut for the club at the age of 17, on 21 October 2018, against Metropolitanos.

References

External links

Living people
2001 births
Association football midfielders
Venezuelan footballers
Venezuelan Primera División players
Monagas S.C. players